Ubiquitin conjugating enzyme E2 F (putative) is a protein that in humans is encoded by the UBE2F gene.

References

External links 
 PDBe-KB provides an overview of all the structure information available in the PDB for Human NEDD8-conjugating enzyme UBE2F

Further reading